Aegerina is a genus of moths in the family Sesiidae.

Species
Aegerina allotriochora Zukowsky, 1936
Aegerina alomyaeformis Zukowsky, 1936
Aegerina mesostenos Zukowsky, 1936
Aegerina ovinia (Druce, 1896)
Aegerina silvai (Köhler, 1953)
Aegerina vignae Busck, 1929

References

Sesiidae